Roy Eldridge 4 – Montreux '77 is a 1977 live album by Roy Eldridge.

Track listing
 "Between the Devil and the Deep Blue Sea" (Harold Arlen, Ted Koehler) – 9:28
 "Go For" (Roy Eldridge) – 7:03
 "I Surrender, Dear" (Harry Barris, Gordon Clifford) – 10:41
 "Joie de Roy" (Eldridge) – 9:04
 "Perdido" (Ervin Drake, Hans J. Lengsfelder, Juan Tizol) – 7:12
 "Bye Bye Blackbird" (Mort Dixon, Ray Henderson) – 7:32

Personnel

Performance
 Roy Eldridge - trumpet
 Oscar Peterson – piano
 Niels-Henning Ørsted Pedersen - double bass
 Bobby Durham - drums

Production
 Phil DeLancie - digital mastering, remastering
 Phil Stern - photography
 Benny Green - liner notes
 Norman Granz - producer

References 

Albums produced by Norman Granz
Albums recorded at the Montreux Jazz Festival
Roy Eldridge live albums
1977 live albums
Pablo Records live albums